USS LSM-297 was a  medium landing ship built for the United States Navy during World War II.

Career 
USS LSM-297 was laid down on 5 October 1944 at Charleston Navy Yard in South Carolina and was launched on 30 October 1944. She was commissioned on 18 December 1944.<ref name="Navsource"

During World War II LSM-297 was assigned to the Pacific Theater. She was decommissioned on 4 November 1957 at Astoria, Oregon, and sold for scrapping in November 1958.

References 

Ships of the United States Navy
1944 ships
LSM-1-class landing ships medium